El Peru del Apere Airport  is an airport serving the town of El Peru del Apere in the Beni Department of Bolivia. The runway is adjacent to the west side of the town, which is on a bend of the Apere River.

See also

Transport in Bolivia
List of airports in Bolivia

References

External links 
OpenStreetMap - El Peru
OurAirports - El Peru
Fallingrain - El Peru Airport

Airports in Beni Department